Jokbal(족발) is a Korean dish consisting of pig's trotters cooked with soy sauce and spices. It is usually braised in a combination of soy sauce, ginger, garlic, and rice wine. Additional ingredients used can include onion, leeks, garlic, cinnamon and black pepper.

History 
Jokbal is presumed to have originated from braised pork, a local food of Hwanghae-do, where pigs' legs are boiled. The current jokbal is a food that started in Jangchung-dong in the 1960s, and is known to have been developed by grandmothers from Pyeongan-do and Hwanghae-do for a living. In the 1960s and 1970s, it began to be widely known through visitors to Jangchung Gymnasium, where professional wrestling games were frequently held.

Preparation 
The hair is removed from the trotters and they are thoroughly washed. Scallions, garlic, ginger, cheongju (rice wine) and water are brought to a boil. The trotters are added, brought back to a boil and then simmered until tender. After this, additional measures of water, sugar and soy sauce are poured into the pot, and the contents are slowly stirred. Once the trotters are fully cooked, they are de-boned and cut into thick slices. They are then served with a fermented shrimp sauce called saeujeot, cloves of raw peeled garlic, and spicy peppers.

Serving 

As jokbal is a dish usually shared by several people, it is generally served in large portions, and as it is greasy and has a strong flavour, Korean diners often eat it as ssam, wrapped in a piece of lettuce with sauces and other vegetables. Jokbal is considered an anju, and thus is often accompanied with soju. Restaurants serving jokbal frequently offer both a regular and a spicy version of the dish, with especially spicy versions being dubbed buljokbal—literally "fire jokbal". Most also offer other variations, including Busan-style naengchae jokbal, which is served cold and garnished with chilled vegetables.

Nutrition 
Jokbal contains a lot of gelatin, and is thus said to promote firm, wrinkle-free skin. The amino acid methionine, found in pork, is claimed to counteract the effects of alcohol and to prevent hangovers. Korean sources also attribute numerous other beneficial effects to pork products like jokbal.

Jokbal Street 
The area around Dongguk University Station in Jangchung-dong, Seoul is known for its numerous jokbal restaurants. The restaurants have long histories, some having been open for as many as 50 years, and all claim to be the "original" jokbal restaurant. Most of the restaurants have opened franchises throughout the country and offer delivery services.

Gallery

See also 
 Korean cuisine
 Pickled pigs feet
 Schweinshaxe

References

External links 

 Jangchung-dong Jokbal Street, Korea Tourism Organization
 The story of food: Jokbal 

Korean pork dishes
Pig's trotters
Street food